The Zillertal Alps are a mountain range of the Central Eastern Alps on the border of Austria and Italy.

Name
The range is named after the Zillertal (Ziller river valley) on its north.

Geography
The range is bounded by the Tuxerjoch mountain pass to the north (separating it from the Tux Alps); the Birnlücke - Forcella del Picco pass to the east (separating it from the Hohe Tauern); the Eisack and its tributary the Rienz to the south (separating it from the Southern Limestone Alps); and the Brenner Pass to the west (separating it from the Stubai Alps).

Sub-groups

The Zillertal Alps are divided into the following sub-groups:
 Tux main ridge (Tuxer Hauptkamm)
 Zillertal main ridge (Zillertaler Hauptkamm) and side ridgesThis is further sub-divided as follows: Hauptkamm, Hochstellerkamm, Greinerkamm, Mörchen and Igentkamm, Floitenkamm, Ahornkamm, Riblerkamm, Magnerkamm.
 Reichenspitze Group and eastern Ziller ridgesThis is further subdivided as follows: Reichenspitzkamm, Gerloskamm, Schönachkamm, Wimmerkamm, Schwarzachkamm, Zillerkamm, Klockerkarstock.
 Pfunderer Mountains (Pfunderer Berge)This is further subdivided as follows: Kreuzspitzkamm, Plattspitzkamm, Wurmaulkamm, Grubbachkamm, Mühlwalder Kamm.

Peaks
The main peaks of the Zillertal Alps are:

Passes
The main mountain passes of the Zillertal Alps are:

External links

CheckCams in the Zillertal Alps

 
Mountain ranges of the Alps
Mountain ranges of Tyrol (state)
Rieserferner-Ahrn Nature Park